Gorham is an unincorporated community in Billings County, North Dakota, United States.

Name
Gorham was named after Fred E. Gorham (1877–1965), an early rancher in the area. Gorham also served as a commissioner in Billings County.

Post office
A post office was established in Gorham on July 28, 1899, and Thomas Jefferson McDonald (1854–1915) served as the postmaster. The post office was discontinued on April 12, 1905.

References

Unincorporated communities in North Dakota
Populated places in Billings County, North Dakota